The Arabian Cement Co. (ACC) is a Libyan company involved in production of cement, lime, gypsum and paper bags for cement packaging, and other construction related operations. It has a total production capacity of roughly 3.340 million tons per year (t/yr) and currently operates seven plants throughout Libya. The company's investment volume was estimated at Ld 180 million.

Background
Nationally, the cement sector in Libya is not a major economic actor. Nevertheless, on a sectoral level, the impact of the production of cement on the natural and social environment in Libya is important. ACC was formed as a state-owned company in 1988, resulting from a merger between the National Cement & Building Materials Establishment and the Souk El Khamis General Cement & Building Materials Corporation. Since then, cement manufacture in Libya has been the sole domain of two parastatals; the ACC and the Libyan Cement Co. In 1998, ACC operated four plants: El Mergeb with a 330,000-t/yr capacity, and Souk, El Khamis, and Lebda each with a 1-M/yr capacity. Production from the two companies satisfied most domestic demand, and minimal surplus was available for export; on average, capacity utilization was 50%. In 2001, the Libyan Government proposed a number of state company projects for which joint ventures would be considered. These included an expansion of ACC's cement plants in Libda and Zliten, valued at $242 million and $169 million respectively.

In February 2005, the initial public offering of shares in the formerly state-owned ACC resulted in the sale of 60% of the company for $273 million. Later that year, ACC proposed to build a second 1-Mt/yr-capacity cement production line at its Zliten plant.

It was the country's first IPO and the biggest sale of a government-owned business as Col. Muammar el-Qaddafi's government began stepping up efforts to attract private investment and open the economy after the lifting of international sanctions on Libya in 2004.

See also
Libyan Cement Company
Libyan Iron and Steel Company

Notes

References

J.M. Cowan (1994), The Hans Wehr Dictionary of Modern Written Arabic
Philip M. Mobbs (1998), The Mineral Industry of Libya
Philip M. Mobbs (2001), The Mineral Industry of Libya
Philip M. Mobbs (2005), Minerals Yearbook: Libya, USGS
Mukhtar M. Ashour (2004), Economics of seawater desalination in Libya Tajora Research Center

Cement companies of Libya
Companies established in 1988
1988 establishments in Libya
Libyan brands